Lunca Corbului is a commune in Argeș County, Muntenia, Romania. It is composed of nine villages: Bumbueni, Catane, Ciești, Lăngești, Lunca Corbului, Mârghia de Jos, Mârghia de Sus, Pădureți and Silișteni.

Natives
 Constantin Cristescu

References

Communes in Argeș County
Localities in Muntenia